The Jonathan Ross Show is a British chat show which began airing on ITV on 3 September 2011.

Series overview

Episodes

Series 1

Series 2

Series 3

Series 4

Series 5

Series 6

Series 7

Series 8

Series 9

Series 10

Series 11

Series 12

Series 13

Series 14

Series 15

Series 16

Series 17

Series 18

Series 19

Jonathan Ross' New Year Comedy Special

Series 20

Notes

References

Lists of British comedy television series episodes
Lists of variety television series episodes